Roger Halvorson (February 12, 1934 – November 2, 2014) was an American politician and businessman.

Born in Waterville, Iowa, Halvorson served in the Iowa National Guard. He received his bachelor's degree from Upper Iowa University. He was a teacher, real estate developer, and in the insurance business. Halvorson served in the Iowa House of Representatives from 1975 to 1997 as a Republican. He died in Marquette, Iowa.

Notes

1934 births
2014 deaths
People from Allamakee County, Iowa
Upper Iowa University alumni
Businesspeople from Iowa
Republican Party members of the Iowa House of Representatives
20th-century American businesspeople